Figure skating at the 1964 Winter Olympics took place at the Olympiahalle in Innsbruck, Austria. There were three events contested: men's singles, ladies' singles, and pair skating.

Medal table

Results

Men

Referee:
  Henry M. Beatty

Assistant referee:
  Oskar Madl

Judges:
  Adolf Walker
  Gérard Rodrigues Henriques
  Geoffrey S. Yates
  Sonia Bianchetti
  William Lewis
  Franz Wojtanowskyj
  Emil Skákala
  Ardelle Sanderson
  Sergei Vasiliev

Ladies

Referee:
  Elemér Terták

Assistant referee:
  Karl Enderlin

Judges:
  Ernst Bauch
  Néri Valdes
  Pamela Davis
  Masao Hasegawa
  Suzanne Francis
  C. Paul Engelfriet
  Edwin Kucharz
  Gunvor Toreskog
  Walter Fritz (CF only)
  Emil Skákala (FS only)

Pairs
At the 1964 Olympics, Kilius/Bäumler, Wilkes/Revell, and Joseph/Joseph placed second, third, and fourth respectively. In 1966, Kilius/Bäumler's results were invalidated after it was discovered that they had signed professional contracts before the Olympics.  At the time, only amateurs were allowed to compete in the Olympic Games. The silver medals were transferred to Wilkes/Revell and the bronze medals to Joseph/Joseph. The Germans were re-awarded the silvers in 1987, after appealing that other pairs had signed similar contracts but had not been exposed and disqualified. The placements of Wilkes/Revell and Joseph/Joseph remained unclear for many years. In December 2013, the IOC clarified that the Canadian pair had not been stripped of their silver after the Germans regained their medals. In November 2014, the IOC stated that both the German and Canadian pairs are the silver medalists and the Americans are the bronze medalists.

Referee:
  Ernst Labin

Assistant referee:
  Alexander D.C. Gordon

Judges:
  Erika Schiechtl
  Néri Valdes
  Michele Beltrami
  Suzanne Francis
  C. Paul Engelfriet
  Hans Meixner
  Walter Fritz
  Dagmar Řeháková
  Mary Louise Wright
  Sergei Vasiliev

References

External links
  (figure skating starts on page 130)
 Winter Olympic Memories: Men
 Winter Olympic Memories: Ladies
 Winter Olympic Memories: Pairs
 Skatabase: Men
 Skatabase: Ladies
 Skatabase: Pairs

 
1964 Winter Olympics events
1964
1964 in figure skating
International figure skating competitions hosted by Austria